Peni Finau (born 5 August 1981), originally known as Peni Lesubulamailepanoni, is a Fiji footballer defender currently playing for Fijian football club Ba F.C.

International career
Finau made his debut for Fiji at the South Pacific Games 2003 and he has played for them in the 2010 FIFA World Cup qualification tournament. He is the brother of Osea Vakatalesau, who also plays for Ba F.C.

Achievements
 2015 Fiji Football Association Cup Tournament Golden Boot

External links
 Player profile - YoungHeart Manawatu club website
 
 2007/2008 season stats - NZFC

Living people
1981 births
Fijian footballers
Fiji international footballers
Fijian expatriate footballers
Ba F.C. players
I-Taukei Fijian people
YoungHeart Manawatu players
Lautoka F.C. players
Association football defenders
2008 OFC Nations Cup players
2012 OFC Nations Cup players
Expatriate association footballers in New Zealand
Fijian expatriate sportspeople in New Zealand